Log Lane Village is a statutory town in Morgan County, Colorado, United States. The population was 913 at the 2020 census.

Log Lane Village was named from the presence of log houses in the town.

Geography
Log Lane Village is located in central Morgan County at  (40.270752, -103.827374). The town is bordered to the northeast by the South Platte River and to the southwest by Colorado State Highway 144. Interstate 76 passes just south of the town, with access to Highway 144 at Exit 79. I-76 leads southwest  to Denver and northeast  to Sterling.

Demographics

As of the census of 2000, there were 1,006 people, 289 households, and 239 families residing in the town. The racial makeup of the town was 73.86% White, 0.50% African American, 1.49% Native American, 0.89% Asian, 19.58% from other races, and 3.68% from two or more races. Hispanic or Latino of any race were 52.78% of the population.

There were 289 households, out of which 52.6% had children under the age of 18 living with them, 65.7% were married couples living together, 12.8% had a female householder with no husband present, and 17.0% were non-families. 12.8% of all households were made up of individuals, and 3.8% had someone living alone who was 65 years of age or older. The average household size was 3.48 and the average family size was 3.83.

In the town, the population was spread out, with 38.5% under the age of 18, 9.4% from 18 to 24, 29.8% from 25 to 44, 16.9% from 45 to 64, and 5.4% who were 65 years of age or older. The median age was 26 years. For every 100 females, there were 106.6 males. For every 100 females age 18 and over, there were 99.7 males.

The median income for a household in the town was $33,947, and the median income for a family was $35,536. Males had a median income of $25,913 versus $19,167 for females. The per capita income for the town was $11,502. About 13.0% of families and 16.6% of the population were below the poverty line, including 20.0% of those under age 18 and 9.3% of those age 65 or over.

Economy
As of 2020, four marijuana dispensaries operate in Log Lane Village.

See also

Morgan County, Colorado

References

External links
Town of Log Lane Village
CDOT map of the Town of Log Lane Village

Towns in Morgan County, Colorado
Towns in Colorado